The Bride and Groom is a double rock pinnacle, about  high, near the small German town of Dahn in the state of Rhineland-Palatinate and in the southern Palatine Forest, the German half of the Wasgau region.

Geography 
Opposite them to the northeast, on the other side of the Wieslauter stream, rises the symbol of Dahn, the 70-metre-high Jungfernsprung crag. The surrounding Dahner Felsenland region is particularly rich in such strikingly shaped bunter sandstone rock formations, that have better withstood the weathering and erosion of softer layers of rock.

Sport climbing 
In the South Palatinate Climbing Area the Bride and Groom are a much sought-after destination.
According to the nomenclature used by sport climbers they are two towers between which there is a chimney, known as the Großer Kamin ("Great Chimney") and which is rated as a medium (III) climbing grade on the UIAA scale. The difficulty of the total of eleven climbing routes on the rocks varies from grades I to VII-.

References

External links 
 swissmountains.ch: Braut & Bräutigam (basic data)
 wanderportal-pfalz.de: Rundwanderung 50: Dahner Felsen- und Burgenrunde (with location plan)
 Climbing impressions from the Palatinate: Braut und Bräutigam (photo report)

Rock formations of Rhineland-Palatinate
Dahn
Climbing areas of Germany
Geography of the Palatinate (region)
Heritage sites in Rhineland-Palatinate
Natural monuments in Rhineland-Palatinate